Same sex  may refer to:
 A phrase used in the discussion of sex or gender
 Gonochorism, the state of having just one of at least two distinct sexes in any one individual organism
 Homosexuality, the romantic attraction, sexual attraction or sexual behavior between members of the same sex or gender
 Sex segregation, the physical, legal, and cultural separation of people according to their biological sex 
 Same-sex education, the practice of conducting education where male and female students attend separate classes
 Same-sex marriage, the marriage between two people of the same sex 
 Same-sex relationship, a relationship between two persons of the same sex, in diverse forms

See also
 Opposite sex (disambiguation)

Sex segregation